The Society of Neuroscientists of Africa (SONA) is a non-profit organisation registered in Nairobi, Kenya, which acts as the umbrella organisation for different neuroscience groups and societies in Africa. They organise the bi-annual SONA conference. The current president of the society is Prof. James Olukayode Olopade.

History 
SONA was founded in 1993 by James Kimani. The goal of the society is to promote neuroscience research and teaching in Africa. In its history the society has organised 14 international meetings in Africa, of which the first was organized in 1993.

Conferences 
 1993 - Nairobi, Kenya
 1995 - Marrakech, Morocco
 1997 - Cape Town, South Africa
 1999 - Dakar, Senegal
 2001 - Nairobi, Kenya
 2003 - Abuja, Nigeria
 2005 - Cape Town, South Africa
 2007 - Kinshasa, Democratic Republic of Congo
 2009 - Faiyum, Egypt
 2011 - Addis Ababa, Ethiopia
 2013 - Rabat, Morocco
 2015 - Durban, South Africa
 2017 - Entebbe, Uganda
 2019 - Lagos, Nigeria

References

External links 
SONA Official Website
Neuroscience On LSD

Neuroscience organizations
Non-profit organisations based in Kenya
Organizations established in 1993